Upper Sheringham is a village and a civil parish  in the English county of Norfolk. The nearest railway station is at Sheringham for the Bittern Line which runs between Sheringham, Cromer and Norwich. The nearest airport is Norwich International Airport. Nearby road connections are the A149 King's Lynn to Great Yarmouth road to the north of the village and the A148 King's Lynn to Cromer road just to the south. The parish of Upper Sheringham in the 2001 census, a population of 214, reducing slightly to 209 at the 2011 Census. For the purposes of local government, the parish falls within the district of North Norfolk.

Description
The name Sheringham is of Scandinavian origin and has the meaning The Ham of Scira’s people. It is thought that Scira may have been a Viking warlord who was given the land as a reward for his performance in battle. The village is located a little south west on higher ground above the town of Sheringham. The village is bound to the west by the National Trust property of Sheringham Hall and its estate. To the south is the hill line known as the Cromer Ridge. The village is known locally as "Upper Town" as compared to the town of Sheringham (town) itself.

All Saints' Church
The parish church of All Saints is famous for a 15th-century bench ends including one, just inside the north door, of a mermaid.  Popular legend has it that the mermaid sought refuge in the church from a storm at sea. There is also an infant wrapped in swaddling bands. The church also retains the floor and front parapet of the rood loft described as "the best survival of its kind in all East Anglia's 1200-odd medieval churches."

References

Gallery

Villages in Norfolk
Civil parishes in Norfolk
North Norfolk